Edoardo is the Italian form of the English male given name Edward. Notable people named Edoardo include:
 Edoardo Agnelli (industrialist) (1892–1935), Italian industrialist
 Edoardo Alfieri (1913–1998), Italian sculptor
 Edoardo Amaldi (1908–1989), Italian physicist
 Edoardo Ballerini (born 1970), Italian-American actor, writer and director
 Edoardo Bassini (1844–1924), Italian surgeon
 Edoardo Bennato (born 1949), Italian singer-songwriter
 Edoardo Bosio (born 1864), Italian-Swiss footballing innovator
 Edoardo Chiossone (1833–1898), Italian engraver and painter
 Edoardo Prettner Cippico (1905–1983), Italian catholic priest
 Edoardo de Martin (21st century), Italian bobsledder
 Edoardo Garzena (1900–1984), Italian featherweight professional boxer
 Edoardo Gori (born 1990), Italian rugby union player
 Edoardo Isella (born 1980), Mexican footballer
 Edoardo Mangiarotti (1919–2012), Italian fencer
 Edoardo Mapelli Mozzi (born 1983), British property developer
 Edoardo Molinari (born 1981), Italian golfer
 Edoardo Reja (born 1945), Italian football coach
 Edoardo Sanguineti (1930–2010), Italian writer
 Edoardo Scarfoglio (1860–1917), Italian author and journalist
 Edoardo Sonzogno (1836–1920), Italian publisher

See also
 Edward
 Eduardo
 Édouard
 Eduard
 Edvard

Italian masculine given names
Italian names of Germanic origin